Louis Ralph Sherman was an Anglican bishop in Canada in the 20th century.

Born on 22 August 1886 in Fredericton, New Brunswick, he was educated at Christ Church, Oxford and ordained after a period of study at Ripon College Cuddesdon in 1912. He began his ordained ministry as a curate at the Christ Church Mission, Poplar. Returning to Canada he held a similar post at Trinity Church, Saint John, New Brunswick. He was the priest in charge and then the rector of the Church of the Holy Trinity, Toronto and Rector of Holy Trinity Cathedral, Quebec and Dean of Quebec from 1925 to 1927, before being consecrated Bishop of Calgary. In 1943 he also became Archbishop and Metropolitan of Rupert's Land, dying in post on 31 July 1953.

References

1886 births
1953 deaths
Alumni of Christ Church, Oxford
Alumni of Ripon College Cuddesdon
Deans of Quebec
Anglican bishops of Calgary
Anglican bishops of Rupert's Land
Metropolitans of Rupert's Land
People from Fredericton
20th-century Anglican Church of Canada bishops
20th-century Anglican archbishops